History of the Theory of Numbers is a three-volume work by Leonard Eugene Dickson  summarizing work in number theory up to about 1920. The style is unusual in that Dickson mostly just lists results by various authors, with little further discussion. The central topic of quadratic reciprocity and higher reciprocity laws is barely mentioned; this was apparently going to be the topic of a fourth volume that was never written .

Volumes
 Volume 1 - Divisibility and Primality - 486 pages
 Volume 2 - Diophantine Analysis - 803 pages
 Volume 3 - Quadratic and Higher Forms - 313 pages

References

External links
 History of the Theory of Numbers - Volume 1 at the Internet Archive.
 History of the Theory of Numbers - Volume 2 at the Internet Archive.
 History of the Theory of Numbers - Volume 3 at the Internet Archive.

History of mathematics
Mathematics books
Number theory
Squares in number theory